Michael Eben (born January 29, 1946) is a former wide receiver who played ten seasons in the Canadian Football League, mainly for the Toronto Argonauts. Eben also played for the Hamilton Tiger-Cats, Ottawa Rough Riders and Edmonton Eskimos. Eben was initially drafted by the BC Lions in 1968 as the first overall draft pick in the CFL draft. Eben played college football at the University of Toronto and won the Hec Crighton Trophy in 1967 as the most outstanding Canadian university player. While playing professional football he earned his doctorate in German literature from the University of Toronto.

He taught at Upper Canada College for 22 years. Eben taught French at Sterling Hall School, an independent school in Toronto, Canada following his retirement from UCC. He now consults at various schools in the Toronto area. Married with two children, Eben has been doing voice over work and narration for radio and television for more than fifteen years. He has done numerous commercials, sports promotions and recently was a German translator on the 10 part series "The Greatest Tank Battles" featured on The History Channel.

External links
MIKE EBEN (1968-69, 71-77)

References

1946 births
Living people
Canadian football wide receivers
Canadian people of Czech descent
Canadian players of Canadian football
Czechoslovak emigrants to Canada
Edmonton Elks players
Hamilton Tiger-Cats players
Naturalized citizens of Canada
Ottawa Rough Riders players
Toronto Argonauts players
Toronto Varsity Blues football players
University of Toronto alumni
People from Žatec
Sportspeople from the Ústí nad Labem Region